The Henry and Mary Cyrus Barn in Lebanon, Oregon, in the United States was added to the National Register of Historic Places on November 9, 2015.

See also
 National Register of Historic Places listings in Linn County, Oregon

References

Barns on the National Register of Historic Places in Oregon
Lebanon, Oregon
National Register of Historic Places in Linn County, Oregon
Barns in Oregon